Midnight Guest is the fourth extended play by South Korean girl group Fromis 9. It consists of five tracks, including the lead single "DM". The extended play was released by Pledis Entertainment on January 17, 2022.

Background and release
On December 15, 2021, Pledis Entertainment announced that Fromis 9 would be releasing a new extended play in January 2022. On December 30, it was announced the extended play would be release on January 17, 2022, and titled Midnight Guest, in the same announcement, a concept trailer was also released. On December 31, the promotional schedule was released. On January 6, 2022, nine concept film for each members was released. On January 10, the track listing was released with "DM" announced as the lead single. On January 11, the highlight medley video was released. On January 15 and 16, the teaser music video for "DM" was released. The extended play alongside the music video for "DM" was released on January 17.

Composition
"DM" was described as a pop song with "faint chord progression and funky bassline" with lyrics about "the excitement of the moment when Fromis 9, who succeeded in escaping at dawn, approaches the person [they] likes and boldly confesses [their] love". "Escape Room" was described as a R&B dance song characterized by "addictive piano lines, dreamy guitar sound, synth bass, and sensuous chord progression". "Love is Around" was described as a pop ballad song and sung by members Lee Sae-rom, Song Ha-young, Jang Gyu-ri, and Lee Chae-young. "Hush Hush" was described as a house genre song and sung by members Park Ji-won, Roh Ji-sun, Lee Seo-yeon, Lee Na-gyung, and Baek Ji-heon. Park Ji-won and Lee Seo-yeon also participated in writing and composition of "Hush Hush". "0g" was described as a song with "warn syntax sound" and characterized by "various instruments".

Promotion
Prior to the extended play's release, on January 17, 2022, Fromis 9 held a in-person live event, which was also broadcast live online, to introduce the extended play and communicate with their fans.

Commercial performance
On January 13, YG Plus announced Midnight Guest had more than 120,000 pre-order sales. Midnight Guest debuted at position 2 on South Korea's Gaon Album Chart in the chart issue dated January 16–22, 2022.

Track listing

Charts

Weekly charts

Monthly charts

Release history

References

2022 EPs
Fromis 9 EPs
Korean-language EPs
Hybe Corporation EPs